Nils Gunnar Lorentz Nilsson (23 March 1923 – 13 May 2005) was a Swedish heavyweight boxer who won a silver medal at the 1948 Summer Olympics. After the Olympics he turned professional and had a record of 12 wins, 4 losses and 2 draws before retiring in 1956.

1948 Olympic results
Below is the record of Gunnar Nilsson, a Swedish heavyweight boxer who competed at the 1948 London Olympics:

 Round of 16: defeated Mohammad Jamshidabads (Iran) by disqualification in the second round
 Quarterfinal: defeated Adam Faul (Canada) on points
 Semifinal: defeated Hans Muller (Switzerland) on points
 Final: lost to Rafael Iglesias (Argentina) by second-round knockout (was awarded silver medal)

References

1923 births
2005 deaths
Heavyweight boxers
Olympic boxers of Sweden
Boxers at the 1948 Summer Olympics
Olympic silver medalists for Sweden
Olympic medalists in boxing
Swedish male boxers
Medalists at the 1948 Summer Olympics